Utklippan is a Swedish island group including Södraskär (South skerry), Norraskär (North skerry), and Degerhuvudet. It has been home to a lighthouse since 1789.

History
Utklippan has been a light station since 1789 when a basket light was in use. The current tower (built in 1870) replaced an older tower built in 1840 on top of an old fortress. The flame ran on colza oil. In 1887 the colza oil lamp was replaced with a kerosene lamp. It has been powered electrically since 1948.

Utklippan was turned into a nature reserve in 1988. The Swedish Maritime Administration owns the lighthouse today. In the summer of 2008 SMA reported that the white main light had been deactivated, as it was no longer considered to be an important lighthouse for commercial shipping. A small passing light remains in use.

Geography
Utklippan consists of three main islands – Södraskär, Norraskär, and Degerhuvudet – in addition to some smaller skerries.

Between Södraskär and Norraskär is a fishing harbour. Today it is protected and mainly used for recreational boats. There are five other houses on the islands, owned by the Swedish National Property Board. One of them is a small hostel.

Despite its remote location, Utklippan is home to varied wildlife including frogs, earless seals, blue mussels, and seaweed. A birding station exists to watch and research migrating birds in the spring and autumn.

The bedrock on Utklippan consists of granite. There are traces of the ice sheet that used to cover the Baltic Sea.

See also

 List of lighthouses and lightvessels in Sweden

References

External links
 Sjofartsverket  
 The Swedish Lighthouse Society
 Utklippans fyr 

Lighthouses completed in 1870
Lighthouses in Sweden